Parry Sound is a town in Ontario, Canada, located on the eastern shore of the sound after which it is named. It is a single tier government located in the territorial District of Parry Sound which has no second tier County, Regional or District level of government. Parry Sound is a popular cottage country region for Southern Ontario residents. It also has the world's deepest natural freshwater port.

History

During the early part of the 20th century, the area was a popular subject for the many scenic art works of Tom Thomson and members of the Group of Seven. There was a slight decline in economic activity shortly after World War I with J.R. Booth's construction of a rival town, Depot Harbour on nearby Parry Island, but this setback was overcome through later developments in tourism and commerce, and the accidental destruction by fire of the entire town of Depot Harbour on August 14, 1945.

The body of water that gives the town its name was surveyed and named by Captain (later Admiral) Henry Wolsey Bayfield in the 19th century, in honour of the Arctic explorer Sir William Edward Parry. In 1857, the modern townsite was established near the Ojibwa village of Wasauksing ("shining shore") at the mouth of the Seguin River.  The post office was established in 1865. Parry Sound was incorporated as a town in 1887.  In the late 19th century, rail service was established, making the town an important depot along the rail lines to Western Canada.

In 1916, a cordite factory was established in the nearby town of Nobel for the Imperial Munitions Board. In the late 1920s and early 1930s, an explosives and munitions factory was also built at Nobel, making Parry Sound an important part of both the First World War and the Second World War effort.

Forest fire protection history

The Parry Sound Forest Fire District was founded by Ontario's former Department of Lands and Forests (now the MNR) in 1922 as one of 17 districts to help protect Ontario's forests from fire by early detection from fire towers. The headquarters for the district were housed in town. It was the central location for 18 fire tower lookouts, including the Parry Sound fire tower, which was erected in the same location as the modern lookout tower at 17 George Street. In the 1970s all the towers had been decommissioned as aerial fire fighting techniques were employed. Fire suppression is of enhanced concern in and near Parry Sound due to this area's strong tendency toward drier weather coinciding with the period of highest sun, in June and July. In drier-summer years, drought can be a significant concern here, and with it, heightened wildfire risk.

Climate

Parry Sound has a humid continental climate, with some quite-unusual local variations in cloudiness and precipitation for this climate, resulting from its location on the eastern shore of the large body of water comprising Parry Sound and Lake Huron to its west. January as the coldest month, July as the warmest.

Much more unusual (for Dfb climates) is Parry Sound's average annual cycle of precipitation, and cloudiness vs. sunshine. With its location on the eastern side of large bodies of water, where prevailing winds and weather come from the west (typical in the mid-latitude Northern Hemisphere), Parry Sound experiences an exceptionally strong lake effect. From spring to mid-summer, this means lake waters are cooler than nearby land areas, resulting in diminished intensity of low pressure systems and less precipitation, but alternation of low clouds and fog (resulting from warmer air passing over snow-covered ground, frequent into May most years) with occasional sunshine, especially once the long winter's snow cover has melted (mostly May through July). Parry Sound's average driest month is July; here, thunderstorms are rare, due to cool lake waters inhibiting the combination of heat and humidity that fuels thunderstorm activity over areas like the central, southern and eastern United States.

From September to January in Parry Sound the lake effect reverses its stabilizing effect from spring into mid-summer, becoming destabilizing. During these months, nearby waters release their stored warmth from the summer season, and increasingly strong polar and Arctic air outbreaks pass over these still-relatively-warm waters before hitting Parry Sound. This results in heavy cumulus cloud formation, instability rain showers (in September and October), transitioning toward heavy snow showers and squalls as temperatures continue to drop from November to January. Such heavy winter-month precipitation and snowfall figures are virtually nonexistent in humid continental climates, which tend to exist away from large bodies of water. As winter transitions toward spring, snowfall drops sharply by March, when lake and land temperatures nearly equalize. In winter, the heavy lake-effect snowfall is augmented by snowfall from sometimes-strong low-pressure systems (mid-latitude cyclones) that often converge on the Great Lakes and areas further east.

Overall, Parry Sound experiences a typical humid continental, cool-summer climate type in terms of temperatures - but a highly unusual climate regime in precipitation and cloudiness; the year's driest months are generally from March through July, while its wettest months are from September to January, with autumnal lake effect producing cloudy skies and heavy rainfall from September into November, followed by extremely heavy snowfall in December and January.

Demographics

According to the 2016 census, the median total income of economic families in 2015 was $69,911.

Culture 

Parry Sound is the birthplace of hockey legend Bobby Orr, the namesake of the local community centre and the town's own Bobby Orr Hall of Fame. In Orr's best-selling autobiography, Orr: My Story, he speaks highly of Parry Sound, the friends and family who resided there and the happy childhood he had living in that part of Canada.

Canadian actor Don Harron's stage character Charlie Farquharson remains one of the town's most cherished personalities. Former Ontario premier Ernie Eves also called the town home for many years; he was the MPP for the Parry Sound—Muskoka riding from 1981 through 2001.

The town is home to several cultural festivals, including the Festival of the Sound classical music festival, an annual dragonboat race and a buskers' festival which takes place as part of the town's Canada Day festivities. The Charles W. Stockey Centre for the Performing Arts serves as the principal performance venue during the Festival of the Sound, and also hosts concerts, live theatre and other cultural events throughout the year.

Recreation and sports
There are several provincial parks in the Parry Sound area, including Oastler Lake, The Massasauga and Killbear, as well as numerous provincial conservation reserves, including the Georgian Bay Biosphere Reserve, one of only 13 UNESCO sites in Canada. The eastern coast of Georgian Bay where Parry Sound is located is known as the "30,000 Islands" and is considered the world's largest freshwater archipelago.  It covers 347,000 hectares of shoreline ecosystem, and over 100 species of animals and plants that are at risk in Canada and Ontario, including unique reptiles and amphibians.  Parry Sound's Aspen Valley Wildlife Sanctuary cares for injured and orphaned animals, and offers an informational and interpretive centre for wildlife education.  A 230-kilometre recreational trail, the Park-to-Park Trail, connects Killbear with Algonquin Provincial Park in two locations, to the south at Dwight, and farther north, east of Kearney.

Parry Sound, and much of Central and Northern Ontario, are well known for their tourism businesses.  Accommodation businesses range from hotels and full service resorts to lodges and camping grounds.  Sightseeing tours of the 30,000 Islands are offered by Georgian Bay Airways, and the Island Queen and MV Chippawa cruise ships. kayak and canoe rentals and tours are available during the summer, as well as winter sporting gear rentals during the winter.  The town is home to an annual ATV Jamboree and guided ATV tours of the region's wilderness are available throughout the year.  There are several golf courses located in and near Parry Sound; ice hockey, fishing, cross-country skiing, and softball are also popular recreational sports in the area. Cross-country skiing in the Parry Sound area is based out of Georgian Nordic Outdoor Activity Centre (GNOAC). Famous NHLer Bobby Orr played minor hockey for the Parry Sound Shamrocks. Aidan Dudas also played for the Shamrocks, and currently plays for the Owen Sound Attack of the OHL, and was selected in the fourth round (113th overall) of the 2019 NHL Draft by the Los Angeles Kings. The town had a junior team also called the Shamrocks for a short period of time who reached the Northern Ontario Junior Hockey Association championship finals in 1998 and 1999 before the team folded in 2003.

Transportation

Parry Sound is located along a highway which currently bears the dual designation of Highway 69/Highway 400. From the opening of this freeway alignment in 2004 until October 26, 2010, a point one kilometre north of Parry Sound's Bowes Street/McDougall Road interchange was the terminus of Highway 400, but the freeway now begins 17 kilometres further north, at Highway 559 north of Nobel. The former alignment of Highway 69 from Parry Sound southerly to Holmur now has the street name Oastler Park Drive and serves as the main access road to Oastler Lake Provincial Park.

The western termini of Highway 124, which extends easterly to Sundridge, and Highway 518, which heads east to Kearney, are both located just outside Parry Sound's town limits.

Bus service from Toronto is available by Ontario Northland Motor Coach Services, the government-owned transportation company, and buses arrive daily en route to Sudbury.  In addition, Via Rail's Canadian (Toronto – Vancouver) transcontinental passenger train serve Parry Sound railway stations twice a week both east- and westbound. Westbound passenger as well as Canadian Pacific Railway and Canadian National Railway freight trains are carried over the Seguin River by the Parry Sound CPR Trestle, a visible presence in the centre of town.

The town is served by the Parry Sound Area Municipal Airport and the Parry Sound Medical Heliport, as well as numerous small water aerodromes:
 Parry Sound Harbour Water Aerodrome (CPS1)
 Parry Sound/Deep Bay Water Aerodrome (CPT6)
 Parry Sound/Derbyshire Island Water Aerodrome (CDS6)
 Parry Sound/Frying Pan Island-Sans Souci Water Aerodrome (CPS9)
 Parry Sound/Huron Island Water Aerodrome (CPS8)
 Parry Sound/St. Waleran Island Water Aerodrome (CPD6)

Canadian Coast Guard Parry Sound Base

Canadian Coast Guard has a base in Parry Sound at 28 Waubeek Street. The base has berthing and maintenance facilities for CCG vessels. CCGS Samuel Risley and CCGS Cove Isle are the current home ported vessels at the CCG base. There is a helipad at the base.

Media

Radio

Television

Newspapers
 North Star - The Parry Sound North Star

Notable people
List of notable people associated with Parry Sound:

 Marty Adams, actor, writer and comedian
 Samuel Armstrong (1844–1921), businessman and politician
 James Arthurs (1866–1937), politician and senator 
 Bill Beagan (born 1937), National Hockey League referee and commissioner of four hockey leagues
 William Rabb Beatty (1851–1905), businessman and politician
 Neil Belland (born 1961), professional ice hockey player
 Fred Bourdginon (1906–1995), professional ice hockey player 
 John Brackenborough (1897–1993), professional ice hockey player 
 Gerald Carson (1903–1956), professional ice hockey player 
 Wayne Clairmont (born 1943), professional ice hockey player
 Terry Crisp (born 1943), professional ice hockey player and coach
 Eleanor Joanne Daley (born 1955), composer and choir director
 Douglas Durkin (1884–1967), novelist, short story writer and screenwriter
 Ernie Eves (born 1946), lawyer, politician and 23rd Premier of Ontario
 Donald Guloien, business executive
 Mark Ideson (born 1976), Paralympic wheelchair curler
 Allan Loney (1885–1965), hockey player charged with manslaughter
 William Morgan (born 1975), Paralympic judoka 
 Bobby Orr (born 1948), professional ice hockey player and Hockey Hall of Fame inductee
 Francis Pegahmagabow (1891-1956) deadliest sniper in world war 1
 Gary Sabourin (born 1943), professional ice hockey player
 James Sharpe (1846–1935), merchant and politician
 Fred J. Stevenson (1895–1928), aviator and bush pilot
 William Sutherland (1926/27–1998), politician
 Graham Ritchie (born 1998), Olympic and professional cross country skier

See also

 List of towns in Ontario
 List of population centres in Ontario

References

External links 

 
Populated places on Lake Huron in Canada
Single-tier municipalities in Ontario
Towns in Ontario